The Colony of the Queen Charlotte Islands was a British colony  constituting the archipelago of the same name from 1853 to 1858, when it was amalgamated into the Colony of British Columbia. In 2010 the archipelago was renamed Haida Gwaii.

The Queen Charlotte Colony was created by the Colonial Office in response to the increase in American marine trading activity resulting from the gold rush on Moresby Island in 1851.  No separate administration or capital for the colony was ever established, as its only officer or appointee was James Douglas, who was simultaneously Governor of Vancouver Island. He was granted a commission as Lieutenant-Governor of the Queen Charlotte Islands in September 1852.

While ostensibly the archipelago was a British colony, historical evidence, such as a seasonal mission of exploration to survey the islands as late as 1859 does not support the establishment of a permanent European settlement following the unsuccessful conclusion to the Queen Charlottes Gold Rush in 1853.

Prior to and during its establishment as a nominative British colony, the archipelago was inhabited by groups belonging to the Haida people, which made up the sole population 
of the ostensible colony.

See also 
 Haida people
 Haida Gwaii
 Queen Charlottes Gold Rush

References

Lillard, Charles. Just East of Sundown:The Queen Charlotte Islands.
Sage, W. N. (Walter Noble), 1888–1963. 1930. “Sir James Douglas and British Columbia.” B. BC Historical Books. [Toronto] : The University of Toronto Press. doi:http://dx.doi.org/10.14288/1.0375702. 

Former British colonies and protectorates in the Americas
Colony of the Queen Charlotte Islands
Pre-Confederation British Columbia
Haida
British North America
1863 disestablishments
States and territories established in 1853
1853 establishments in Canada